HD 203949 is a K-type giant star 257 light-years away in the constellation of Microscopium. Its surface temperature is 4618 K. It is either on the red giant branch fusing hydrogen in a shell around a helium core, or more likely a red clump star currently fusing helium in its core. As is common for red giants, HD 203949 has an enhanced concentration of sodium and aluminium compared to iron.

Multiplicity surveys did not find any stellar companions around HD 203949 as of 2019.

Planetary system
In 2014, one planet orbiting HD 203949 was discovered by the radial velocity method. The planet is highly unlikely to have survived the red giant stage of stellar evolution on the present orbit. It is likely to be recently scattered from a wider orbit.

The planetary system configuration is favourable for direct imaging of exoplanets in the near future, and was included in the top ten easiest targets known by 2018.

References

Microscopium
K-type giants
Planetary systems with one confirmed planet
J21262286-3749458
105854
CD-38 14551
203949
8200